Bermondsey Town Football Club is a football club based in Rotherhithe, England. They are currently members of the Southern Counties East Football League First Division and play at St Paul's Sports Ground, groundsharing with Fisher.

History
In 2013, Bermondsey Town were formed, playing Sunday league football. In 2017, the club switched to Saturday football, joining the Surrey South Eastern Combination. In 2022, the club was admitted into the Southern Counties East Football League Division One.

Ground
After entering the Surrey South Eastern Combination, Bermondsey used the Crystal Palace National Sports Centre. The club currently play at St Paul's Sports Ground, Rotherhithe, groundsharing with Fisher and Millwall Community Trust.

References

Bermondsey
Association football clubs established in 2013
2013 establishments in England
Football clubs in England
Football clubs in London
Sport in the London Borough of Southwark
Surrey South Eastern Combination
Southern Counties East Football League